The Phi Pan Nam Range, also Pee Pan Nam, is a  long system of mountain ranges in the eastern half of the Thai highlands. It is mostly in Thailand, although a small section in the northeast is within Sainyabuli and Bokeo Provinces, Laos.

In Thailand the range extends mainly across Chiang Rai, Phayao, Lampang, Phrae, Nan, Uttaradit and Sukhothai Provinces, reaching Tak Province at its southwestern end. The population density of the area is relatively low. Only two sizable towns, Phayao and Phrae, are within the area of the mountain system and both have fewer than 20,000 inhabitants each. Larger towns, like Chiang Rai and Uttaradit, are near the limits of the Phi Pan Nam Range, in the north and in the south respectively.

Phahonyothin Road, part of the AH2 Highway system, crosses the Phi Pan Nam Range area from north to south, between Tak and Chiang Rai. There are two railway tunnels of the Northern Line across the Phi Pan Nam mountains. Both are on the south side of the range: the 130.2 m Huai Mae Lan Tunnel in Phrae Province and the 362.4 m Khao Phlueng Tunnel in Uttaradit and Phrae Provinces.

In the mountains north of Thoeng, at the northeast end of the range, Hmong people live in small villages such as Ban Saen Than Sai and Ban Phaya Phripak, the latter on top of a mountain pass.

Geography
The Phi Pan Nam Range is composed of many smaller mountain chains roughly aligned in a north–south direction in its northern part and, further south, in a northeast–southwest direction. These ranges cover an extensive area and are often separated by intermontane basins or lowlands. They end in the west with the Khun Tan Range, in the east with the Luang Prabang Range, and with the Central Plain of Siam in the south. The northern tip is bound by the Mekong River.

There are columnar basalt formations in Mon Hin Kong in an area in the mountains near Na Phun, Wang Chin District, Phrae Province. In Phae Mueang Phi there are mushroom rocks and other bizarre rock formations caused by erosion.

Sub-ranges
The Phi Pan Nam range system is often divided in two physiographic longitudinal sections: 
 Western Phi Pan Nam Range (เทือกเขาผีปันน้ำตะวันตก) or Phi Pan Nam Range proper, in the northwest between the Wang and Yom Rivers. Some scholarly works designate the Khun Tan Range as the "Western Phi Pan Nam Range" and this section therefore as the "Central Phi Pan Nam Range".
 Eastern Phi Pan Nam Range (เทือกเขาผีปันน้ำตะวันออก), also known as "Phlueng Range" (ทิวเขาพลึง) in the southeast between the Yom and the Nan Rivers.

Mountains
It is in the northwestern area of the range near Phayao town, but there are a number of lesser mountains with the name 'Doi Luang' throughout the range. Other noteworthy peaks are:

 
Doi Phu Langka (1,641 m)
Doi Chi (1,638 m)
Doi Pha Mon at Phu Chi Fa (1,628 m)
Doi Pha Tang (1,608 m)
Doi Cha Tong (1,603 m)
Doi Ku (1,557 m)
Doi Yao (1,543 m )
Doi Huai Nam Lao (1,544 m)
Doi Nang (1,507 m)
Phu Chi Fa (1,442 m)
Doi Luang, Mae Chai District (1,426 m)
Doi Phu Kheng (1,403 m)
Doi Luang, Ban Na Fai (1,396 m)
Doi Pha Khi Nok (1,365 m)
Doi Luang Pae Mueang(1,328 m)
Khun Huai Han (1,303 m)
Doi Phu Nang (1,202 m)
Doi Nang (1,195 m)
Doi Ian (1,178 m)
Doi Khun Mae Loe (1,075 m)
Doi Pha Daeng (1,023 m)
Doi Pha Mon(1,013 m)
Doi San Klang (938 m)
Doi Ngaem (867 m)
Doi Pui (843 m)
Doi Kham, Thoeng District (823 m)
Doi San Pan Nam (773 m)
Mon Yao (751 m)
Doi Yang Kham (727 m)
Doi Pae Luang (651 m)
Doi Huai Ha (590 m)
Doi Lan (559 m)

Hydrography
The Phi Pan Nam range of mountains is not as high as neighboring mountain systems. It is, however, significant from the hydrographic point of view. These mountains divide the Mekong from the Chao Phraya watershed and important rivers of Thailand have their source in the Phi Pan Nam area. Its name in Thai "ทิวเขาผีปันน้ำ" roughly means "the mountains of the spirits dividing the waters", 'spirits' (ผี phi) here referring to ancient mountain deities of Thai folklore.

Among the Thai rivers that originate in the Phi Pan Nam Mountains the main ones are the Wang and Yom River, with their tributaries such as the Ngao, flowing towards the Chao Phraya. The Ing and the Lao, a tributary of the Kok River, flow northwards and are part of the Mekong basin. A great number of smaller rivers have their sources in mountains across the range.

The Sirikit Dam is at the southeastern edge of the Phi Pan Nam mountains.

History
There were formerly large teak forests in some areas of the range. However, at the beginning of the 20th century concessions were given to logging companies and the forest cover dwindled dramatically especially in lowland areas between ranges. Deforestation also has affected areas that were cleared for local agriculture. Often wildfires are deliberately set off by local farmers, as well as by speculators who hire people to set forests on fire in order to claim land title deeds for the areas that have become "degraded forest".

Owing to the relative isolation of the area there was Communist insurgency in the mountainous forests of the Phi Pan Nam Range during the Cold War. A memorial was erected on 1,118 m high Doi Phaya Phipak (ดอยพญาพิภักดิ์) to commemorate the victims of the battles between troops of the Royal Thai Armed Forces and the insurgents of the Communist Party of Thailand between the 1950s and the 1970s. There is now a historical site and a forest park at Doi Phaya Phipak, also known as Phaya Phipak.

A controversial dam was planned in the central area of the range on the Yom River in Kaeng Suea Ten in 1991 but this project was later abandoned in the face of popular opposition. The debate about the dam, however, resumed in 2011. Two smaller dams on the Yom River may be built instead of the Kaeng Suea Ten mega-dam.

Ecology

Generally the forested areas of the Phi Pan Nam are known for their teak and bamboo forest. The mountain ranges are covered with tropical dry broadleaf forests, including sections of moist evergreen forest, mixed deciduous forest, dry deciduous forest, as well as hill evergreen forest at higher altitudes. There is great biodiversity in these mountains and their few unspoilt valleys, with a wide range of animal and plant species. The whole area of the range is part of the Central Indochina dry forests ecoregion.

There are a number of protected areas in the Phi Pan Nam mountains, mostly encompassing mountainous terrain. These are patchily distributed across the range, and the largest national parks are in its central part, roughly around Phayao town. Protected sectors are typically surrounded by agricultural zones, often near roads and villages and thus with vast surfaces under the influence of the edge effect.

Besides the national parks and wildlife reserves, there are the Huai Tak Teak Biosphere Reserve in Lampang Province and the Phu Langka Forest Park, located in Chiang Kham District and Pong District of Phrae Province. The main attractions of the forest park are Doi Hua Ling, Doi Phu Lang Ka and Doi Phu Nom; the latter is a breast-shaped hill rising in an area of grassland.

Flora
Formerly there were large extensions of teak (Tectona grandis) forests in the range, including the highly appreciated golden teak variety. These forests are now much reduced. Forest fires are common during the dry season.

Some of the other species of trees found in the forests of the mountains are: Afzelia xylocarpa, Ailanthus triphysa, Anisoptera costata, Artocarpus lacucha, Berrya ammonilla, Betula alnoides, Cinnamomum iners, Dalbergia oliveri, Dillenia pentagyna, Dipterocarpus obtusifolius, Dipterocarpus alatus, Dipterocarpus turbinatus, Duabanga grandiflora, Garcinia indica, Hopea odorata, Irvingia malayana, Lagerstroemia loudonii, Lagerstroemia calyculata, Lagerstroemia tomentosa, Lithocarpus densiflorus, Mangifera caloneura, Michelia champaca, Michelia floribunda, Pterocarpus macrocarpus, Schleichera oleosa, Terminalia bellirica, Toona ciliata, Vitex pinnata and Xylia xylocarpa.

Fauna

The endangered animal species sheltered by some of the fragmented, although relatively undisturbed Phi Pan Nam forests are the fishing cat, sun bear, Asiatic black bear, Chinese pangolin, Indochinese tiger, sambar deer, gaur, Bengal slow loris, Sunda pangolin, as well as the Asiatic softshell turtle and the big-headed turtle.

There are also Asian elephants in their natural habitat in a few protected areas, such as in the Si Satchanalai National Park. Formerly there were also in the Wiang Ko Sai National Park but there have been no sightings in recent years.
The green peafowl, now rare in the wilderness and threatened by habitat destruction throughout Southeast Asia, breeds in the central mountains of the range from January to March.

Among the other animals, the Indian muntjac, Burmese hare, Indian hare, Indochinese flying squirrel, black giant squirrel, Java mouse-deer, jungle cat, mainland serow, masked palm civet, Asian palm civet, Malayan civet, bamboo rat and northern treeshrew, as well as the Bengal monitor deserve mention.

A variety of birds are found in the range such as the blue-winged siva, white-rumped shama, scaly-breasted munia, black bulbul, blue-throated barbet, pin-striped tit-babbler, blue-bearded bee-eater, crested kingfisher, sooty-headed bulbul, coppersmith barbet, great hornbill, chestnut-headed bee-eater and the red-billed blue magpie.

Protected areas

Doi Chong National Park
Doi Luang National Park
Doi Pha Khlong National Park
Doi Phu Nang National Park
Khun Sathan National Park
Lam Nam Kok National Park
Lam Nam Nan National Park
Mae Phuem National Park
Mae Yom National Park
Nanthaburi National Park
Phu Sang National Park
Si Nan National Park
Si Satchanalai National Park
Tham Pha Thai National Park
Tham Sakoen National Park
Wiang Ko Sai National Park
Doi Pha Chang Wildlife Sanctuary
Lam Nam Nan Phang Kha Wildlife Sanctuary
Nam Pat Wildlife Sanctuary
Wiang Lo Wildlife Sanctuary

Ranges and features of the system

See also 
Deforestation in Thailand
 Thai highlands
Si Satchanalai historical park

Further reading
Google Books, The Physical Geography of Southeast Asia

References

External links

Chiang Rai National Parks, Mountains and Waterfalls - Chiang Rai Attractions
North Region Trip 4 Pay respects to Phra That’s year of birth - Old Lana Temple, and conquer Phu Lanka-Phu Ka Phrae – Nan- Phayao
Attractions in Phayao
ดอยหนอก

 
Mountain ranges of Laos
Mountain ranges of Thailand
Geography of Bokeo province
Geography of Sainyabuli province
Geography of Phayao province
Geography of Chiang Rai province
Geography of Lampang province
Geography of Nan province
Geography of Phrae province
Geography of Uttaradit province
Geography of Sukhothai province
Geography of Tak province
Wildfire ecology